There It Is is the 33rd studio album by American musician James Brown. His second release for Polydor Records, it contained five of his early-1970s hits. The album was released on June 9, 1972. It reached #10 on the Billboard R&B charts and #60 on the Billboard 200.

Track listing

Personnel
James Brown – record producer, arranger on tracks 1, 3, 5-8
Dave Matthews – arranger on tracks 2, 4
Fred Wesley – arranger on track 9
Joseph M. Palmaccio – digital remastering

References

1972 albums
James Brown albums
Albums arranged by David Matthews (keyboardist)
Albums produced by James Brown
Polydor Records albums